ROCS Chen De (PFG-1208) is a Kang Ding-class frigate of the Republic of China Navy.

Development and design 
As the ROC (Taiwan)'s defensive stance is aimed towards the Taiwan Strait, the ROC Navy is constantly seeking to upgrade its anti-submarine warfare capabilities. The US$1.75 billion agreement with France in the early 1990s was an example of this procurement strategy, the six ships are configured for both ASW and surface attack. The Exocet was replaced by Taiwan-developed Hsiung Feng II anti-ship missile and the AAW weapon is the Sea Chaparral. The main gun is an Oto Melara 76 mm/62 mk 75 gun, similar to its Singaporean counterparts, the Formidable-class frigates. Some problems in the integration of Taiwanese and French systems had been reported. The frigate carries a single Sikorsky S-70C(M)-1/2 ASW helicopter.

The Sea Chaparral SAM system is considered inadequate for defense against aircraft and anti-ship missiles, so the ROC (Taiwan) Navy plans to upgrade its air-defense capabilities with the indigenous TC-2N in 2020. The AMRAAM missiles will be quad-packed in a vertical launch system for future ROCN surface combatants, but a less-risky alternative arrangement of above-deck, fixed oblique launchers is seen as more likely for upgrading these French-built frigates.

Construction and career 
Chen De was launched on 2 August 1996 at the DCNS in Lorient. Commissioned on 19 March 1998.In May 2013, Hong Shicheng, the captain of Guangxing 28, was killed by the Philippine Coast Guard’s fire on a Taiwanese fishing boat, which led to tensions between Taiwan and the Philippines. For this reason, the Southern Regional Patrol Bureau of the Coastal Patrol Administration of the Republic of China Executive Yuan’s Coastal Patrol Bureau announced on May 12. Chen De and the Jiyang-class missile frigate, formed a joint fleet to go to the waters around Taiwan and the Philippines to strengthen maritime patrols.

References 

1996 ships
Ships built in France
Kang Ding-class frigates